The 1997–98 Élite Ligue season was the 77th season of the Élite Ligue, the top level of ice hockey in France. 10 teams participated in the league, and Brûleurs de Loups de Grenoble won their fourth league title.

First round

Second round

Playoffs

External links
Season on hockeyarchives.info

France
1997–98 in French ice hockey
Ligue Magnus seasons